This is a list of people who have served as High Steward of Ipswich in Suffolk.

 1557-1580: Sir William Cordell
 1581-1590: Sir Francis Walsingham
 1590-1596: The Lord Hunsdon
 1596-1600: The Earl of Essex
 1600-1608: The Lord Buckhurst 
 1609-1626: The 1st Earl of Suffolk
 1627-1640: The 2nd Earl of Suffolk
 1653-1688: The 3rd Earl of Suffolk
 1692-1698: The Lord Cornwallis
 1703-1727: The 3rd Earl of Dysart
 1800-1805: The Viscount Nelson
 1806-1821: The 6th Earl of Dysart.
 1821-1848: Sir Robert Harland, Bt
 1849-1874: Charles Austin
 1875-1882: John Chevallier Cobbold
 1882-1884: Sir Richard Wallace, Bt
 1884-1909: The Lord Gwydyr
 1909-1916: The Viscount Kitchener of Khartoum
 1916-1932: Sir Edward Packard
 1932-1949: The Lord Woodbridge
 1950-1964: The Lord Cranworth
 1967-1988: Sir Frank Trowbridge Mason
 1990-present: Stuart Leonard Whiteley

References

 

Ipswich
People from Ipswich